The 1906–07 Northern Football League season was the eighteenth in the history of the Northern Football League, a football competition in Northern England.

Clubs

The league featured 11 clubs which competed in the last season, along with one new club: 
 Leadgate Park

League table

References

1906-07
1906–07 in English association football leagues